Rádio Globo is a Brazilian contemporary hit radio network, owned by Sistema Globo de Rádio (Grupo Globo's radio division). It was launched on 2 December 1944.

Its journalists anchors are Roberto Canázio and Rosana Jatobá. The company employs more than 200 other journalists.

Until 15 July 2019, Rádio Globo was a full-service network. On that date, the network "flipped" to a Brazilian-style CHR format (also known in the country as "popular radio"), retaining the football broadcasts (branded as "Futebol Globo no Rádio" and simulcast with sister network CBN).

Owned-and-operated stations 
 Rio de Janeiro: ZYD 471 - FM 98.1 MHz

Programs and Communications 
 Vai na Fé (Padre Omar)
 Café das Seis
 RJ: Fernando Ceylão e Mariliz Pereira Jorge
 SP: Mariana Godoy e Marc Tawil
 Papo de Almoço (Léo Jaime, Fernanda Gentil, Adriane Galisteu, Tiago Abravanel, Marcos Veras)	
 Tá Rolando Música (Rafa Ferraz)
 Redação Globo (Rosana Jatobá)
 Zona Mista
 RJ: Pop Bola
 SP: Rodrigo Rodrigues
 Globo Esportivo
 RJ: Marcelo Barreto
 SP: Oscar Ulisses
 Radar do Esporte and Esporte S/A (Carlos Eduardo Eboli)
 Convocadas (Fernanda Gentil)
 Mundo da Luta (Rhodes Lima)
 Em Cartaz (Charles Gavin, Maurício Valladares,  Henrique Portugal, Dedé Teicher, Diogo Nogueira)
 Sai do Ar (Rafa Ferraz e Thiago Matheus)
 Cartola FC (Hugo Lago)
 Segue o Jogo (Felipe Andreoli)
 Futebol à Manivela and Domingo + Esportivo (Maurício Bastos)
 Trilha de Craques and Galera da Bola (Rodrigo Rodrigues)
 Revista Rádio Globo (Roberto Canázio)

References

External links 
 Official website

Globo radio stations
Mass media in Rio de Janeiro (city)